Leabrook is a suburb of Adelaide, South Australia in the City of Burnside.

It is a primarily residential suburb in eastern Adelaide, and was the site of Coopers Brewery, until its relocation to Regency Park, South Australia.

Most of the suburb previously known as Knightsbridge now lies within Leabrook.

References

Suburbs of Adelaide